Pimpalgaon Raja is a gram panchayat located in tahsil Khamgaon of Buldhana district of Maharashtra situated on bank of River Dnyanganga.  It is 14 km from  Khamgaon.Pimpalgaon Raja is a large village located in Khamgaon of Buldana district.

Geography
20° 43' 0" North, 76° 26' 0" south

Places 
MALVIPURA MASJID 
Renuka Devi Temple (Shivkalin temple). pilgrim mostly visit during the navratris popularly known as Jagdamba Temple 
Mahadev Temple 
Gajanan Maharaj Temple

Education
Zilha Parishad Marathi Primary Girls School
Zilha Parishad Marathi Primary School.
Zilha Parishad High School And Junior College Pimpalgaon Raja
Gulshan-e-hafiza urdu primary school pimpalgaon raja
 Sahakar Vidya Mandir Pimpalgaon Raja
Jamia Ammar bin Yaseer Rz Pimpalgaon Raja
 Urdu High School & Junior College Pimpalgaon Raja
 Madarsah Deeniyat Taqiya Masjid

Agriculture

Agriculture is the primary economic activity in the town.

Nearby places
Places around Pimpalgaon Raja:
Tarwadi (9 km / 6 mi.Tarwadi is 292° West-northwest of Pimpalgaon Raja WNW)
Goshing (12 km / 8 mi.Goshing is 262° West of Pimpalgaon Raja W)
Nandura (13 km / 8 mi.Nandura is 8° North of Pimpalgaon Raja N, Pop. 39,650)
Khamgaon (14 km / 9 mi.Khamgaon is 104° East Southeast of Pimpalgaon Raja ESE, Pop. 94,604)

References

Villages in Buldhana district